These Here Are Crazy Times! is the second studio album by Australian rock group Boom Crash Opera, released in October 1989. The album was the breakthrough album to the lucrative U.S. Market for the band & was released in the United States by Giant records. This release had 2 new reworked versions of the songs "Talk About It" and "The Best Thing". Both songs were re-recorded with producer Jimmy Iovine of U2 fame, after Bono from U2 became a fan of the band during the U2 Love Town tour of Australia in 1989.

Track listings

Australia
"Onion Skin" – 3:28
"Where There's A Will" – 3:59
"The Best Thing" – 4:13
"Piece Of The Pie" – 4:54
"Forever" – 3:56
"Get Out of the House!" – 3:18
"Talk About It" – 4:02
"End Up Where I Started" – 3:13
"Dancing in the Storm" – 4:12
"Mountain Of Strength" – 4:09
"Axe To Grind" – 3:03
"Superheroes" – 4:43

United States
"Onion Skin"
"Talk About It?!"
"The Best Thing"
"Piece Of The Pie"
"Get Out Of The House"
"Mountain Of Strength"
"Dancing In The Storm"
"Forever"
"Axe To Grind"
"Where There's A Will"

Personnel 
Dale Ryder - Lead Vocals
Greg O'Connor - Keyboards, Guitar
Peter Farnan - Guitar, Bass, Keyboards, Vocals
Peter Maslen - Drums, Vocals
Richard Pleasance - Guitar, Bass, Vocals

Charts

Weekly charts

Year-end charts

Certifications

References

1989 albums
Boom Crash Opera albums